Thomas Mayne Reid (4 April 1818 – 22 October 1883) was an Irish-American novelist who fought in the Mexican–American War (1846–1848). His many works on American life describe colonial policy in the American colonies, the horrors of slave labour and the lives of American Indians. "Captain" Reid wrote adventure novels akin to those by Frederick Marryat and Robert Louis Stevenson, and set mainly in the American West, Mexico, South Africa, the Himalayas, and Jamaica. He was an admirer of Lord Byron.

Biography

Early years
Reid was born in Ballyroney, a hamlet near Katesbridge, County Down, in present day Northern Ireland, the son of Rev. Thomas Mayne Reid Sr., who was a senior clerk of the General Assembly of the Presbyterian Church in Ireland. His father wanted him to become a Presbyterian minister, and in September 1834 he enrolled at the Royal Belfast Academical Institution. He stayed for four years, but lacked motivation to complete his studies and graduate. He headed back to Ballyroney to teach at a school.

In December 1839 Reid boarded the Dumfriesshire, bound for New Orleans, Louisiana, arriving in January 1840 and soon finding a job as a corn factor's clerk in the corn market. After six months in New Orleans, he is said to have left for refusing to whip slaves. Reid later used Louisiana as the setting of one of his successful books, an anti-slavery novel entitled The Quadroon.

Reid then travelled to Tennessee, where on a plantation near Nashville he tutored the children of Dr. Peyton Robertson. Some twenty years later, Reid would make mid-Tennessee the setting for his novel The Wild Huntress. After Robertson's death, Reid founded a short-lived school in Nashville. In 1841 he found work as a clerk for a provision dealer in either Natchez, Mississippi, or Natchitoches, Louisiana (the latter seems likelier). Although Reid later claimed to have made several trips West in this period, on which he purportedly based some of his novels, the evidence for this is sketchy and confusing at best.

Literary career
In late 1842 Reid arrived in Pittsburgh, Pennsylvania, where he began writing prose and poetry for the Pittsburgh Morning Chronicle under a pen-name, the Poor Scholar. He also apparently worked as a carrier for the paper. His earliest verifiable work is a series of epic poems called Scenes in the West Indies.

In early 1843, Reid moved to Philadelphia for three years, working as a journalist and periodically publishing poetry in Godey's Lady's Book, Graham's Magazine, the Ladies National Magazine and elsewhere, still using his Pittsburgh pseudonym. There he met Edgar Allan Poe, who became a drinking companion for a time. Poe would later call Reid "a colossal but most picturesque liar. He fibs on a surprising scale but with the finish of an artist, and that is why I listen to him attentively."

When the Mexican–American War began in the spring of 1846, Reid worked as a correspondent for the New York Herald in Newport, Rhode Island, which would likewise be the setting for a novel. At the time added the pen-name Ecolier to the Poor Scholar.
 
On 23 November 1846, Reid joined the First New York Volunteer Infantry as a second lieutenant, leaving by ship with the regiment in January 1847. They camped for several weeks at Lobos Island before joining Major General Winfield Scott's invasion of Central Mexico, which began on 9 March at Vera Cruz. Reid as Ecolier was a correspondent for a New York paper, Spirit of the Times, which published his Sketches by a Skirmisher. On 13 September, at the Battle of Chapultepec, Reid received a severe thigh wound while leading a charge. He was afterward promoted to first lieutenant for bravery in battle. On 5 May 1848 he resigned his commission and in July returned to New York with his regiment.

Love's Martyr, Reid's first play, was staged at the Walnut Street Theater, Philadelphia, for five nights in October 1848. He published War Life, an account of his army service, on 27 June 1849.

Learning of the Bavarian Revolution, Reid headed for England to volunteer, but after the Atlantic crossing changed his mind and went home to Ireland instead. He soon moved to London and in 1850 published his first novel, The Rifle Rangers. This was followed by The Scalp Hunters (1851; dedicated to Commodore Edwin W. Moore, whom he met in 1841), The Desert Home (1852), and The Boy Hunters (1853). The last, set in Texas and Louisiana, was a "juvenile scientific travelogue" that become a favourite with young Theodore Roosevelt, who became a Reid fan. That year Reid married 15-year-old Elizabeth Hyde, daughter of his publisher, G. W. Hyde, an English aristocrat.

After time off with his new bride, Reid returned to writing. He continued to base his novels on his adventures in America. Several more were successful: The White Chief (1855), The Quadroon (1856), Osceola (1858) and The Headless Horseman (1865). He spent money freely, including building in Gerrards Cross, Buckinghamshire, a sprawling "Rancho", a reproduction of a Mexican hacienda he had seen during the Mexican–American War, where he took to farming. This extravagance led to bankruptcy in November 1866, from which he was discharged in January 1867. That October he left London for Newport, Rhode Island, hoping to repeat his past success in the U.S.. He went back to New York in 1867 and founded the Onward Magazine there.

Last years
Reid lectured at Steinway Hall in New York and published the novel The Helpless Hand in 1868, but America proved less kind than earlier. His wound at Chapultepec started to bother him and he was hospitalized for several months at St Luke in 1870. His wife hated America. After his hospital discharge they returned to England on 22 October 1870, to live at Ross on Wye, Herefordshire.

Reid continued to write stories in England and reworked some earlier novels. "The Death Shot" was published in the Penny Illustrated Paper. In October 1874, an abscess formed on the knee of his wounded leg, leaving him unable to walk without crutches. He was joint editor with John Latey of The Boys' Illustrated News for ten months from 6 April 1881 and wrote for it "The Lost Mountain; a Tale of Sonora." About this time Reid's invention began to flag and he lost popularity, so that he turned to farming near Ross in Herefordshire, although he continued to write. His last novel, No Quarter, set in the Parliamentary wars, and his last boys' book, The Land of Fire, were published after his death on 22 October 1883. He was buried in Kensal Green Cemetery, now part of London. His tombstone quotes from The Scalp Hunters: "This is 'weed prairie'; it is misnamed: It is the Garden of God."

Influence and legacy

Books such as the Young Voyagers had great popularity, especially with boys. His tales of the American West were also popular with children across Europe and Russia. Many became popular in Polish or Russian translation, including The Rifle Rangers (1850), Scalp Hunters (1851), Boy Hunters (1853), War Trail (1851), Boy Tar (1859), and Headless Horseman (1865/6). Vladimir Nabokov recalled The Headless Horseman as a favourite adventure novel of his childhood years – "which had given him a vision of the prairies and the great open spaces and the overarching sky." At 11, Nabokov even translated The Headless Horseman into French alexandrines. Alexander Bek mentions the well-read K. K. Rokossovky, future Marshal of the Soviet Union, referring to Reid's work in early 1942. The Polish writer Czesław Miłosz cites Russian translations of Reid as well-remembered early reading matter, which allowed him to learn Russian and the Cyrillic alphabet. A chapter on Reid appears in his essay collection Emperor of the Earth (1976). Anton Chekhov in Island, a Journey to Sakhalin (1893–94) mentions "Mayne Reid" in Chapter 10: "The morose, angry sea has spread itself boundlessly for thousands of versts. When a little boy has been reading Mayne Reid and his blanket falls off during the night, he starts shivering, and it is than that he dreams of such a sea."

United States President Theodore Roosevelt, in his autobiography, credits Reid with being a major early inspiration. The shy, asthmatic aristocrat, Teddy Roosevelt, would grow up to pursue naturalistic zoology and adventure travel. Russell Miller, in his biography of Arthur Conan Doyle, credits Reid as one of Conan Doyle's favourite childhood authors and a great influence on his writings.

Although Reid called himself and is listed often as Captain, Francis B. Heitman's definitive Historical Register and Dictionary of the U.S. Army only shows him as a lieutenant.

Bibliography
Reid wrote about 75 novels and many short stories and sketches.

The Rifle Rangers; or, Adventures in Southern Mexico (1850)
The Scalp Hunters: A Romance of the Plain (1851)
The Desert Home: The Adventures of a Lost Family in the Wilderness (1851)
The Forest Exiles; or, The Perils of a Peruvian Family Amid the Wilds of the Amazon (1852)
The White Chief; A Legend of North Mexico (1855)
The Boy Hunters, or, Adventures in Search of a White Buffalo (1853)
The Hunter's Feast; or, Conversations Around the Camp-fire (1856)
The Bush Boys: History and Adventures of a Cape Farmer and His Family (1856)
The Quadroon: or, A Lover's Adventures in Louisiana: in 3 volumes (1856)
The War-trail: or, The Hunt of the Wild Horse; a Romance of the Prairie (1857)
The Young Yagers, or, A Narrative of Hunting Adventures in Southern Africa (1857)
The Plant Hunters; or, Adventures Among the Himalaya Mountains (1858)
Osceola the Seminole, or, The Red Fawn of the Flower Land (1858)
Wild Life; or, Adventures on the Frontier (1859)
Odd People; or, Singular Races of Man (1860)
The Lone Ranch (1860)
The Scalp Hunters (1860)
Bruin: The Great Bear Hunt (1860)
The Lone Ranch: A Tale of the Staked Plain (1860)
The Wild Huntress; or, The Big Squatter's Vengeance (1861)
The Maroon: A Tale of Voodoo and Obeah (1862)
Croquet (1863)
The Cliff Climbers (1864)
The Boy Slaves (1865)
The Ocean Waifs: A Story of Adventure on Land and Sea (Ticknor and Fields, 1865)
The Headless Horseman (1866)
The Giraffe Hunters (1867)
Afloat in The Forest; or A Voyage Among the Tree-Tops (1867)
The White Squaw (1868)
The Headless Horseman: A Strange Story of Texas (1868)
The Helpless Hand: A Tale of Backwoods Retribution (1868)
The Planter Pirate: A Souvenir of Mississippi (1868)
"The Child Wife: A Tale of Two Worlds" (1869)
The Yellow Chief: A Romance of the Rocky Mountains (1869)
The Fatal Cord (1869)
The Castaways: A Story of Adventure in the Wilds of Borneo (1870)
The Vee-Boers: A Tale of Adventure in Southern Africa (1870)
The Finger of Fate (1872)
The Death Shot; or, Tracked to Death (1873)
The Cuban Patriot, or, The Beautiful Creole: An Episode of the Cuban Revolution (1873)
The Death Shot (1874)
The Giraffe Hunters (1876)
The Flag of Distress, or A Story of the South Sea (1876)
Gwen Wynn; A Romance of the Wye (1877)
The Man-Eaters (1878)
The Specter Barque: A Tale of the Pacific (1879)
The Captain of the Rifles; or, The Queen of the Lakes: A Romance of the Mexican Valley (1879)
The Land Pirates, or, The League of Devil's Island: A Tale of the Mississippi (1879)
The Ocean Hunters, or, The Chase of the Leviathan: A Romance of Perilous Adventure (1881)
Blue Dick, or, The Yellow Chief's Vengeance: A Romance of the Rocky Mountains (1883)
The Hunters' Feast (serial 1854, book 1883)
Gaspar, the Gaucho, or, Lost on the Pampas: A Tale of the Gran Chaco (1883)
The Island Pirate: A Tale of the Mississippi (1884)
The Land of Fire: A Tale of Adventure (1885)
The Lost Mountain: A Tale of Sonora (1885)
The Free Lances: A Romance of the Mexican Valley (1888)
The Tiger Hunter: A Hero in Spite of Himself (1889)
No Quarter! (1890)
The White Gauntlet (1892)
The Guerilla Chief and Other Tales
The Bandolero, A Marriage among the Mountains
The Boy Tar
The Child Wife
Ran Away to Sea (1857 : George Routledge and Sons)(
Wood Rangers: The Trappers of Sonora
The Young Voyageurs: Boy Hunters in the North (1854)

References

External links

Resources
"Reid, Captain Mayne" Bio - at the Northern Illinois University Libraries
Captain (Thomas) Mayne Reid - Bio and selected free ebooks - at Athelstane
Mayne Reid Manuscripts, c. 1866, U. of North Carolina, Greensboro

"Literary History American West" (PDF 8.7mb) - at Texas Christian University
Sources

Works by Mayne Reid at Manybooks.net

1818 births
1883 deaths
19th-century American novelists
American expatriates in England
American male novelists
Irish novelists
Irish male writers
People from County Down
Burials at Kensal Green Cemetery
Irish emigrants to the United States (before 1923)
American military personnel of the Mexican–American War
19th-century American male writers
Children's writers from Northern Ireland